Dinamo Riga was a Soviet ice hockey club, based in Riga, Latvia. It was founded in 1946 and disestablished in 1995 as Pārdaugava Rīga. In 1949 to 1963 Dinamo Riga was joined with Daugava sports society which was sponsored by Riga's factories VEF and then RVR.

History of Dinamo Riga
Dinamo Riga was established in 1946, after the re-occupation of Latvia by the Soviet Union. It was a part of Dynamo sports society sponsored by the Soviet Ministry of Interior and the national security structures including the KGB. The club was one of the 12 teams which participated in the first Soviet championship in the 1946–47 season. The team's first official game was a victory 5–1 against Dinamo Tallinn in December 1946. The first season was considered as a success, as the team finished the tournament in fourth place. The club's first roster mainly consisted from the players of the interwar Latvian national team.

At first the club had no permanent place, where the home games were held, but since the 1950–51 season, Dinamo started to play home games at Daugava Stadium, but the games still were played on a natural ice rink and the go ahead of the games depended on suitable weather, The situation did not change until the 1960–61 season, when the stadium was heavily reconstructed.

Dinamo Riga changed its name to Daugava Riga before the start of the 1949–50 season, and kept it for a decade, before the team changed its name again. In the mid-fifties, the core of the team - players, which started their careers before the Second World War, started to retire, and the team started to slip further down the table as the years went by.

The club again changed its name and since the 1958–59 season and now was known as RVR Riga, but the name did not last long as the club two years later was renamed once again to Daugava (RVR). The name changes did not help the team's cause and the club slipped to the third division. During the sixties, the club adopted a new player and staff recruiting policy, switching from local talent developing to gathering players from all corners of Soviet Union and even abroad. The club again changed owners and the name of Dinamo Riga was restored before the 1967–68 season, which ended as the worst season in the club's entire history.

In the 1987–88 season, Dinamo Riga had their best finish, losing to CSKA Moscow in the final.

In 1975, Viktor Khatulev of Dinamo Rīga became the first ice hockey player from the Soviet Union drafted by the National Hockey League. He never had a chance to play for the NHL, as Soviet players were not allowed to play for foreign teams. In season 1976–77, Dinamo Rīga star Helmuts Balderis was the leading scorer, had the most goals, and won the best player of the season award (MVP). He was also the goal leader in 1975–76 and the leading scorer in 1983. He scored 333 goals in his Soviet Union League career.

After the end of Soviet Union, the team continued to play until 1995 as a member of the International Hockey League, the successor of the Soviet Hockey League. During this period, the team was called Stars Rīga and later, Pārdaugava Rīga. It was the former team of the Aleksey Nikiforov, coach of many future NHLers.

As of April 7, 2008, the club has been re-established as a member of the Kontinental Hockey League. See Dinamo Riga.

Super Series
Dinamo Riga has also participated in the Super Series in exhibition games against NHL teams in year 1989 and 1990.
Dinamo Riga Super Series record:

Season-by-season record
Note: GP = Games played, W = Wins, L = Losses, T = Ties, Pts = Points, GF = Goals for, GA = Goals against, PIM = Penalties in minutes

Notes:
 The player statistics for the 1987–88 season are the total for both stages.
 Soviet league had no playoffs, except for the 1987–88 season.

Notable players

IIHF Hall of Fame

Players
 Helmuts Balderis, RW, 1967–1977, 1980–1985, inducted 1998
 Artūrs Irbe, G, 1987–1991, inducted 2010

Builders
 Viktor Tikhonov, Coach, 1968–1977 inducted 1998

List of Dynamo Riga players selected in the NHL Amateur Draft
 1975: Viktors Hatuļevs (160th overall)

List of Dynamo Riga players selected in the NHL Entry Draft
 1988: Harijs Vītoliņš (188th overall)
 1989: Artūrs Irbe (196th overall), Helmut Balderis (238th overall)
 1991: Sandis Ozoliņš (30th overall)
 1992: Sergejs Žoltoks (55th overall), Grigorijs Panteļejevs (136th overall), Viktors Ignatjevs (243rd overall)
 1993: Aleksandrs Kerčs (60th overall)

Stanley Cup winners
Players
 Sandis Ozoliņš, D, 1990–1992, won 1996

Olympic champions
Players
 Vitālijs Samoilovs, G, 1982–1989, champion in 1988

World champions
Players
 Helmuts Balderis, RW, 1967–1977, 1980–1985 champion in 1976, 1977, 1983
 Artūrs Irbe, G, 1986–1991, champion in 1989, 1990

World Junior champions
Players

 Anatolijs Antipovs, C, 1978–1981, champion in 1979
 Sergejs Gapejenko, F, 1984–1987, champion in 1986
 Vladimirs Golovkovs, F, 1978–1985, champion in 1979, 1980
 Viktors Hatuļevs, D/LW, 1973–1981, champion in 1974, 1975
 Andrejs Maticins, D. 1981–1990, champion in 1983
 Sandis Ozoliņš, D, 1990–1992, champion in 1992
 Mihails Šostaks, C, 1975–1988, champion in 1976, 1977
 Edmunds Vasiļjevs, F, 1969–1982, champion in 1974
 Germans Volgins, F, 1981–1983, champion in 1983
 Sergejs Žoltoks, C, 1990–1992, champion in 1992

Head coaches

 Jānis Dobelis, 1946–1949
 Edgars Klāvs, 1949–1961
 Anatolijs Jegorovs, 1961–1962
 Georgijs Firsovs, 1962–1963
 Staņislavs Motls, 1967–1968
 Viktor Tikhonov, 1968–1977
 Ēvalds Grabovskis, 1977–1980
 Vladimir Yurzinov, 1980–1989
 Ēvalds Grabovskis, 1989–1991
 Jevgeņijs Banovs, 1992
 Juris Reps, 1992–1994
 Mihails Beskašnovs, 1994–1995
 Leonīds Beresņevs, 1995

Awards and trophies

Pervaya Liga
 1972–73

Soviet MVP
 Helmuts Balderis: 1976–77

Scoring champion
 Helmuts Balderis: 1976–77, 1982–83

Goal scoring champion
 Helmuts Balderis: 1975–76, 1976–77, 1984–85
 Alexei Frolikov: 1982–83

Soviet / Russian League First Team
 Helmuts Balderis: 1976–77

Best Rookie
Artūrs Irbe: 1987–88
Sandis Ozoliņš: 1990–91

See also
 FC Daugava Riga

Citations and references

Cited sources
 

Ice hockey clubs established in 1946
Sports clubs disestablished in 1995
Defunct ice hockey teams in Latvia
Ice hockey teams in Riga
Riga
1946 establishments in the Soviet Union
original